Tadakod  is a village in the southern state of Karnataka, India. It is located in the Dharwad taluk of Dharwad district.

Demographics
As of the 2011 Census of India there were 1,319 households in Tadakod and a total population of 6,524 consisting of 3,377 males and 3,147 females. There were 832 children ages 0-6.

See also
 Dharwad
 Districts of Karnataka

References

External links
 http://Dharwad.nic.in/

Villages in Dharwad district